Marginal Revolution may refer to:
 the development of economic theory in the late 19th century which explained economic behavior in terms of marginal utility and related concepts:
 
 
 Marginal Revolution (blog), an economics blog co-authored by Tyler Cowen and Alex Tabarrok